Still Unforgettable is a 2008 studio album by American singer-songwriter and performer Natalie Cole. Cole won the Grammy Award for Best Traditional Pop Vocal Album for Still Unforgettable at the 51st Grammy Awards.

Background
Speaking in July 2008 to noted UK soul writer Pete Lewis of the award-winning Blues & Soul, Cole discussed the thinking behind 'Still Unforgettable': "While we were still trying to create that same 'Unforgettable'-type mood or environment, this time I wanted to expand. Rather than just doing another Nat 'King' Cole tribute – which was not necessary – I wanted to go deeper into the American Songbook, by not just getting songs from my father, but also from other singers of his time like Frank Sinatra, Lena Horne, Sammy Davis Jr. and Peggy Lee. You know, there was something about the approach that the writers from that era had to the lyrics and the melodies that was so intentional, so purposeful. Which I think is the thing that's missing from music today."

Track listing
Unless otherwise noted, information is based on the album's Liner Notes

Note
Nat King Cole's original version of "Walkin' My Baby Back Home" was recorded on September 4, 1951.

Personnel

Musicians 

 Natalie Cole – vocals 
 Nat King Cole – sampled vocals (1)
 Terry Trotter – acoustic piano (1, 2, 6, 7, 10, 11, 12, 14)
 Tamir Hendelman – acoustic piano (3, 4, 13)
 Alan Broadbent – acoustic piano (5, 9)
 Tom Ranier – celesta (5, 10, 13)
 John Chiodini – guitar (1, 5, 6, 7, 9-14)
 Jim Hughart – bass (1, 2, 5-12)
 Reggie Hamilton – bass (3, 14)
 Chuck Berghofer – bass (4, 13)
 Harold Jones – drums (1, 2, 5-12)
 Jeff Hamilton – drums (3)
 Gregg Field – drums (4, 13)
 Lewis Nash – drums (14)
 Vanessa Brown – percussion, triangle (7)
 Pete Christlieb – tenor saxophone solo (7, 12)
 Charles Loper – trombone (7)
 Andy Martin – trombone (7)
 Rick Baptist – trumpet (7)
 Warren Luening – trumpet (7), trumpet solo (8)

Orchestra 
 Endre Granat – concertmaster

Horns, Reeds and Woodwinds
 Pete Christlieb, Gene Cipriano, Jeff Clayton, Gary Foster, Jennifer Hall, Dan Higgins and Sal Lozano – saxophones 
 Gary Foster, Sal Lozano, Sheridon Stokes and Jim Walker – woodwinds
 Rose Corrigan – bassoon
 Tom Ranier – clarinet
 Tom Boyd – English horn, oboe
 Craig Gosnell, Alan Kaplan, Charles Loper, Andy Martin, Bruce Otto and Dave Ryan – trombone
 Rick Baptist, Wayne Bergeron, Gilbert Castellanos, Daniel Fornero, Warren Luening and Carl Saunders – trumpet 
 Steven Becknell, Nathan Campbell, David Duke, Brian O'Connor and James Thatcher – French horn

Strings
 Trey Henry, Edward Meares, Mike Valerio and Frances Liu Wu – bass
 Larry Corbett, Dennis Karmazyn, Timothy Loo, David Low, Miguel Martinez and Cecilia Tsan – cello
 Katie Kirkpatrick – harp
 Karen Elaine, Matt Funes, Pamela Goldsmith, Darrin McCann  and Jorge Moraga – viola 
 Charlie Bisharat, Mark Cargill, Lily Ho Chen, Kevin Connolly, Mario DeLeon, Joel Derouin, Bruce Dukov, Endre Granat, Songa Lee, Natalie Leggett, Phillip Levy, Liane Mautner, Helen Nightengale, Sid Page, Alyssa Park, Sara Parkins, Bob Peterson, Katia Popov, Lesa Terry and Shalini Vijayan – violin

Arrangements 
 Bill Holman – arrangements (1, 12)
 Jim Hughart – arrangements (3, 7)
 Alan Broadbent – arrangements (5, 6, 9)
 Nan Schwartz – arrangements (8, 10)
 Patrick Williams – arrangements (13)
 Harold Wheeler – arrangements (14)

Production 
 Tena Clark – executive producer 
 Natalie Cole – producer, liner notes 
 Gail Deadrick – co-producer, musical director 
 Al Schmitt – recording, mixing 
 Bill Schnee – additional recording on rhythm tracks (5, 7, 13, 14) at Bill Schnee Studios (North Hollywood, California)
 Travis Ference – additional engineer
 Darius Fong – additional engineer 
 Aaron Walk – additional engineer 
 Steve Genewick – additional vocal engineer, Pro Tools editing
 Doug Sax – mastering at The Mastering Lab (Hollywood, California)
 Diana Barnes – art direction, design 
 Matthew Rolston – photography

Charts

Weekly charts

References

External links
Official site

2008 albums
Natalie Cole albums
Rhino Records albums
Covers albums
Grammy Award for Best Traditional Pop Vocal Album
Traditional pop albums
Sequel albums